Rosa Parks Station may refer to the following public transportation stations:

 Rosa Parks Transit Center, Detroit, Michigan
 Rosa Parks Hempstead Transit Center, Hempstead, New York
 Rosa Parks Transit Station, Jacksonville, Florida
 Willowbrook/Rosa Parks station, Los Angeles, California
 Rosa Parks station (Paris), Paris, France
 Rosa Parks station (TriMet), Portland, Oregon